Huddersfield Town's 1968–69 campaign was Town's first season under new manager Ian Greaves. He would lead Town for six seasons, including two seasons in the top flight. His first season saw Town finish in 6th place in the Second Division, 10 points behind second-placed Crystal Palace.

Squad at the start of the season

Review
Ian Greaves was made the new manager in June 1968 and tried to improve on Town's faltering league form. He brought in new signings Terry Poole from Manchester United and Jimmy Lawson from Middlesbrough. The start to the season was in no way spectacular, with Town winning only 2 of their first 10 matches, although one of those was against eventual champions Derby County. Following that they went on a run of 6 wins out of 7, which helped Town rise the Division 2 table.

From December, Town went on a run of only 1 win in 8, but the last 2 months saw Town lose only 2 more matches from their last 13 matches, which saw Town finish in 6th place with 46 points.

Squad at the end of the season

Results

Division Two

FA Cup

Football League Cup

Appearances and goals

Huddersfield Town A.F.C. seasons
Huddersfield Town